is the first full album released by the Japanese rock band, THE BACK HORN.  It was released on April 24, 2000, and is the band's only full-length independent album.

Track listing

Circus (サーカス) – 4:50
Hashiru Oka (走る丘) – 5:35
Shin Sekai (新世界) – 6:44
Limousine Drive (リムジン ドライブ) – 4:04
Mugen no Koya (無限の荒野) – 4:03
Yomigaeru Hi (甦る陽) – 5:51
Akanezora (茜空) – 5:21
Hitorigoto (ひとり言) – 4:29
Saraba, Ano Hi (さらば、あの日) – 4:55
Naiteiru Hito (泣いている人) – 7:40

The Back Horn albums
2000 albums